Mesogobius batrachocephalus, the knout goby or toad goby, is one of the species of gobiid fish native to the Black Sea and the Sea of Azov basins. It lives in estuaries and brackish water lagoons, occasionally in fresh waters, such as the coastal Lake Siutghiol in Romania. The knout goby is a piscivore. Maximum known age is eight years.

References

Mesogobius
Fish described in 1814
Fish of the Black Sea
Fish of Europe
Fish of Western Asia
Taxonomy articles created by Polbot